Étienne Tortelier (born 14 April 1990 in Rennes) is a French road cyclist, who currently rides for amateur team Sablé Sarthe Cyclisme.

Major results
2011
 4th Overall Mi-Août en Bretagne

References

External links
 
 

1990 births
Living people
French male cyclists
Cyclists from Rennes